Edward John Frank Howe (born 29 November 1977) is an English professional football manager and former player. He is the manager of Premier League club Newcastle United. 

A defender during his playing career, Howe spent most of his playing career with AFC Bournemouth, coming up through the youth system and spending eight years with the club, before returning for a second three-year spell to end his career, and retiring from the professional game in 2007. He entered management the following year, taking charge of a Bournemouth side facing relegation to the Conference National in January 2009 as the youngest manager in the Football League. Under his guidance, Bournemouth were able to survive relegation during his first season in charge, having started the season on minus 17 points, and were promoted to League One the following campaign. 

After a brief spell as manager at Burnley, Howe returned to Bournemouth and led them to two further promotions in three seasons, taking them to the top division of English football. He was subsequently named Football League Manager of the Decade in 2015 following three promotions in a seven-year period. Bournemouth survived in the Premier League for the next five seasons under Howe, before suffering relegation to the Championship in 2020. He resigned as manager of Bournemouth after the club's relegation. At the time of his departure, Howe was the longest serving manager in the Premier League. After a year away from the game, Howe returned to management in 2021 when he was appointed as head coach of Newcastle United following the takeover of the club in 2021.

Playing career
Howe was born in Amersham, Buckinghamshire. When very young, he moved to Verwood in Dorset, and later began his footballing career with local youth teams Rossgarth and Parley Sports before starting his professional career at AFC Bournemouth. He made his first-team debut in December 1995 against Hull City. Howe established himself as an important player in AFC Bournemouth's defence and in 1998 he was selected for the England Under-21 team in the Toulon Tournament.

In March 2002, Portsmouth signed Howe for £400,000, making him new manager Harry Redknapp's first signing. Shortly after signing, a knee injury on his debut against Preston North End ended his season.

He returned for the opening game of the 2002–03 season against Nottingham Forest, but he injured his knee again after only nine minutes and was ruled out for the entire campaign. He did not return to full fitness until January 2004 after 18 months out. He was loaned to Swindon Town on transfer deadline day in March, although he did not feature for the club.

Portsmouth loaned Howe back to AFC Bournemouth for the first three months of the 2004–05. He proved to be successful on his return to his first club after two injury-ravaged seasons with Portsmouth. With the club in a very poor financial state, supporters joined together to create "Eddieshare" to fund a transfer fee. Within days of creation, £21,000 was raised which funded the required permanent transfer fee. After a further three seasons and over 270 appearances, injuries forced his retirement as a player in 2007 and he then moved into coaching with the reserve squad.

Managerial career
In December 2006, at the age of 29, Howe was promoted to the position of player-coach by manager Kevin Bond, and handed the task of coaching AFC Bournemouth's reserve team, though he continued to play in the first team. He retired from football in summer 2007, after he was unable to recover from a knee injury. In September 2008, Howe lost his job when Bond was sacked as manager.

AFC Bournemouth
Howe returned to AFC Bournemouth as a youth coach under Jimmy Quinn and took over as caretaker manager when Quinn was sacked on 31 December 2008. Even though his two games in charge as caretaker manager were away defeats, he was hired as the permanent manager of the club on 19 January 2009 and brought the club out of the relegation zone despite a 17-point deficit.

In the start of the 2009–10 season, Howe won eight out of the nine games, a club record. In November 2009, Championship club Peterborough United approached Howe to replace Darren Ferguson as their manager but Howe rejected their approach.

Despite the club's transfer embargo remaining in place for the rest of the season, AFC Bournemouth secured promotion to League One after two years in the fourth tier of English football thanks to a 2–0 away win at Burton Albion on 24 April 2010.

In early 2011, Howe was approached by several other clubs but on 11 January announced that he was staying at AFC Bournemouth. However, on 14 January 2011, Howe became the new Burnley manager after the club agreed a compensation deal with AFC Bournemouth. He took charge of his 100th and final AFC Bournemouth match of his first managerial spell with the club, later that day in a 2–1 defeat away to Colchester United.

Burnley
On 16 January 2011, Howe was announced as the new manager of Burnley after signing a three-and-a-half-year contract at the Championship club. His first game in charge of Burnley was away to Scunthorpe on 22 January 2011, which ended in a 0–0 draw. Burnley finished 8th in the Championship in season 2010–11 and 13th in season 2011–12 under Howe. He left Burnley in October 2012 citing "personal reasons" for his departure.

Return to AFC Bournemouth
In October 2012, he re-joined his former club AFC Bournemouth as manager. He won the League One Manager of the Month for November after guiding the club to three league wins and two draws, as well as an FA Cup victory. On 20 April 2013, he secured promotion to the Championship with AFC Bournemouth finishing runners-up and one point behind champions Doncaster Rovers. In the 2013–14 season, Howe's AFC Bournemouth finished 10th in the Championship, six points outside of the play-off positions.

On 19 April 2015, Howe was selected as the Manager of the Decade at the Football League Awards.

On 27 April 2015, he secured AFC Bournemouth's promotion to the Premier League. AFC Bournemouth beat Bolton Wanderers 3–0 at the Goldsands Stadium, a win which while not guaranteeing Premier League football for the 2015–16 season, required third placed side Middlesbrough to overcome a 19-goal goal difference with one game left in the season. Howe said of the promotion and of AFC Bournemouth supporters, "It shouldn't be them thanking me, it should be me thanking them. It is a family club and deserves its moment in the sun." AFC Bournemouth confirmed their promotion on the last day of the season, 2 May 2015, with a 3–0 victory at Charlton Athletic and, due to already-promoted Watford's failure to win their last match, were crowned champions of the league.

Howe guided AFC Bournemouth to Premier League survival in their first season in the top flight football, with a 16th-place finish seeing them five points clear of the relegation zone. An even better campaign in 2016–17 saw AFC Bournemouth finish ninth. A year later, he took them to 12th place in the Premier League to secure a fourth consecutive campaign at this level.

 

Howe's side finished in 14th in the 2018–19 Premier League, but the club's 5-year stay in the Premier League ended in 2019–20 after AFC Bournemouth finished in 18th place.

On 1 August 2020, AFC Bournemouth announced that Howe had left the club by mutual consent, after eight years in charge. He became noted at Bournemouth for bringing in young players, improving them, and selling them on at a financial profit.

In May 2021, Howe rejected an offer to become the manager of Celtic. A club statement blamed factors "outwith both his and our control" for the breakdown in their negotiations.

Newcastle United
Howe was appointed to replace Steve Bruce as the manager of Premier League club Newcastle United on 8 November 2021, signing a contract until the summer of 2024. Howe watched from the stands as the club drew 1–1 with Brighton & Hove Albion, in a game in which Graeme Jones was acting as caretaker manager. Jones was retained as first team assistant coach as part of Howe's new coaching staff, which also included Jason Tindall, Stephen Purches and Simon Weatherstone, whom he worked with at AFC Bournemouth, as well as retained Newcastle goalkeeping coach Simon Smith.

His appointment at Newcastle also reunited him with former players at AFC Bournemouth, such as Callum Wilson, Matt Ritchie and Ryan Fraser. On 19 November 2021, Newcastle announced that Howe had tested positive for COVID-19 and would miss the first game in charge. He watched his first game as manager from a hotel room as Newcastle drew 3–3 with Brentford on 20 November.

On 20 April 2022, following a 1–0 victory against Crystal Palace, Howe guided Newcastle to a 6th successive home win, the first time the club had done such a feat since 2004 under Sir Bobby Robson. He guided Newcastle to an 11th place finish in the Premier League after winning 12 in the last 18 games of the season, and made sure Newcastle became the first team in Premier League history to avoid relegation after not winning any of the first 14 games they played. On 5 August 2022, Howe was rewarded with a long-term contract at the club.

On 31 January 2023, Howe guided Newcastle to the EFL Cup final following a 3–1 aggregate victory over Southampton; their first cup final in over 23 years.

Personal life
Howe and his wife Vicki have three sons. On 5 March 2019 Howe was awarded the Freedom of the Borough of Bournemouth by Bournemouth Borough Council. His childhood club was Everton. During the 2020 coronavirus pandemic, Howe became the first Premier League manager to take a pay cut.
His half brother, Steve Lovell, is a football scout at AFC Bournemouth.

Career statistics

Managerial statistics

Honours
AFC Bournemouth
Football League Championship: 2014–15
Football League One runner-up: 2012–13
Football League Two runner-up: 2009–10

Newcastle United
EFL Cup runner-up: 2022–23

Individual
Football League One Manager of the Month: November 2012, April 2013
Football League Championship Manager of the Month: October 2014, March 2015
The Football League Manager of the Decade
LMA Manager of the Year: 2015
LMA Championship Manager of the Year: 2014–15
Premier League Manager of the Month: March 2017, January 2018, October 2018, February 2022, October 2022

References

External links

1977 births
Living people
People from Amersham
Footballers from Buckinghamshire
English footballers
Association football defenders
AFC Bournemouth players
Portsmouth F.C. players
Swindon Town F.C. players
English Football League players
England under-21 international footballers
English football managers
AFC Bournemouth managers
Burnley F.C. managers
Newcastle United F.C. managers
English Football League managers
Premier League managers